The Deputy Prime Minister of Saint Kitts and Nevis is an elected representative in the National Assembly who is appointed by the Governor General on the advise of the Prime Minister. Historically, the person appointed to the position of Deputy Prime Minister is usually the Deputy Leader of the political party that holds the majority of seats in the national assembly or the Leader of another party in the case of a coalition government. The instrument of appointment of the Deputy Prime Minister can be found in the Constitution of St. Christopher and Nevis. The Deputy Prime Minister appointment can be revoked by the Governor General on the advise of the Prime Minister of Saint Kitts and Nevis.

Deputy Premiers 1967-1983

Deputy Prime Ministers since 1983

See also
Prime Minister of Saint Kitts and Nevis
Politics of Saint Kitts and Nevis

References

Saint Kitts
Government ministers of Saint Kitts and Nevis